Golestan-e Mehdi (also Romanized as Golestān-e Mehdī) is a village in Rigestan Rural District, Zavareh District, Ardestan County, Isfahan Province, Iran. At the 2006 census, its population was 122, in 32 families.

References 

Populated places in Ardestan County